Veronica Carstens (born Prior; 18 June 1923 – 25 January 2012) was the wife of the German President Karl Carstens.

She began medical studies in 1941, which she interrupted during the war to work as a nurse. In 1944 she married at Berlin-Tegel Karl Carstens, whom she had met the year before. Temporarily she was a housewife. In 1956 she continued her medical studies, graduating in 1960. 

From 1960 to 1968 she worked as a medical assistant and in 1968 she opened her medical practice in Meckenheim near Bonn. 

Carstens was by profession a doctor of medicine, and she maintained her practice throughout her husband's tenure as president. She was a strong advocate of naturopathy and homeopathy, and in 1982 the Carstens established the Carstens-Foundation (Carstens-Stiftung) – a major funder of alternative medicine research in Europe.  She was an honorary member of the Order of Saint John (Bailiwick of Brandenburg).

She was widowed in 1992. After she had retired from public life in 2009, she lived in a sanitarium in Bonn.

References

External links
Carstens-Stiftung official website (German)

1923 births
2012 deaths
Spouses of presidents of Germany
German general practitioners
Physicians from Bielefeld
German women physicians